Joan Louise Larsen (born December 1, 1968) is an American attorney serving as a United States circuit judge of the United States Court of Appeals for the Sixth Circuit. She previously was an associate justice of the Michigan Supreme Court from 2015 to 2017.

Early life and education 
Larsen was born on December 1, 1968, in Waterloo, Iowa. She earned her Bachelor of Arts from the University of Northern Iowa and received her Juris Doctor from the Northwestern University Pritzker School of Law, where she graduated first in her class in 1993. While at Northwestern, she served as articles editor of the Northwestern University Law Review.

Career 
Larsen became a professor at the University of Michigan Law School in 1998. She clerked for Judge David B. Sentelle of the U.S. Court of Appeals for the D.C. Circuit and for Justice Antonin Scalia of the U.S. Supreme Court during the 1994 term. She served as Deputy Assistant Attorney General in the U.S. Department of Justice Office of Legal Counsel from January 2002 to May 2003 in the administration of President George W. Bush. Larsen did not contribute to the OLC's Torture Memos, and in March 2002 she authored a memo addressing detainee court access.

Michigan Supreme Court 
On October 1, 2015, Larsen was appointed to the Michigan Supreme Court by Governor Rick Snyder to replace Justice Mary Beth Kelly, who announced plans to resign and return to private practice, effective October 1, 2015. She was elected on November 8, 2016, to fill the remainder of Kelly's unexpired term, which ran through the end of 2018. Larsen received 58.7% of the vote in a three-way race against Deborah Thomas and Kerry Morgan. She was on Republican presidential nominee Donald Trump's May 2016 list of potential Supreme Court justices. Her service was terminated due to her appointment to the United States Court of Appeals for the Sixth Circuit.

Federal judicial service 
On May 8, 2017, President Donald Trump nominated Larsen to serve as a United States Circuit Judge of the United States Court of Appeals for the Sixth Circuit, to the seat soon to be vacated by Judge David McKeague. Larsen's nomination was held up for months by Michigan's Senators, Debbie Stabenow and Gary Peters. The two Democrats initially refused to return their blue slips for Larsen, an informal United States Senate practice that essentially gives Senators veto power over federal judicial nominees from their home state. Larsen met separately with Peters and Stabenow on July 26, 2017. Stabenow and Peters both returned blue slips in August 2017, allowing Larsen's hearing to move forward.

A hearing on Larsen's nomination before the Senate Judiciary Committee was held on September 6, 2017. On October 5, 2017, the Judiciary Committee voted on an 11–9 vote to recommend her to the full Senate for a confirmation vote. Senate Majority Leader Mitch McConnell filed a cloture motion to limit debate on Larsen's nomination on October 26, 2017, clearing the path for the full Senate to vote on Larsen's nomination in the first week of November 2017. On October 31, 2017, the Senate voted to invoke cloture on Larsen's nomination by a 60–38 vote, with Stabenow and Peters voting to proceed with the nomination and give Larsen a final up-or-down vote. On November 1, 2017, Larsen was confirmed by a 60–38 vote. Both Stabenow and Peters, along with six other Senate Democrats, joined all 52 Senate Republicans voting to confirm Larsen. She received her commission on November 2, 2017.

Electoral history 
2016

See also 

 List of law clerks of the Supreme Court of the United States (Seat 9)
 Donald Trump Supreme Court candidates

References

Further reading

External links 

 
 
 
 Questionnaire for Judicial Nominees for the United States Senate Committee on the Judiciary
 Contributor profile from the Federalist Society

|-

1968 births
Living people
20th-century American lawyers
21st-century American lawyers
21st-century American judges
Federalist Society members
Judges of the United States Court of Appeals for the Sixth Circuit
Law clerks of the Supreme Court of the United States
Michigan lawyers
Michigan Republicans
Justices of the Michigan Supreme Court
Northwestern University Pritzker School of Law alumni
People from Cedar Falls, Iowa
People from Waterloo, Iowa
American scholars of constitutional law
United States court of appeals judges appointed by Donald Trump
United States Department of Justice lawyers
University of Michigan faculty
University of Northern Iowa alumni
American women legal scholars
American legal scholars
20th-century American women lawyers
21st-century American women lawyers
21st-century American women judges